The Indonesian ocellated flounder, Psammodiscus ocellatus, is an edible flatfish of the family Pleuronectidae. It is a demersal fish that lives on sandy bottoms in the eastern Indian Ocean, particularly Indonesia and northwestern Australia. It can reach  in length.

References

Pleuronectidae
Fish of the Indian Ocean
Fish described in 1862
Taxa named by Albert Günther